Laurence Armstrong (September 2, 1891 – December 21, 1968) was a Canadian sprinter. He competed in three events at the 1924 Summer Olympics.

References

External links
 

1891 births
1968 deaths
Athletes (track and field) at the 1924 Summer Olympics
Canadian male sprinters
Olympic track and field athletes of Canada
Sportspeople from Sault Ste. Marie, Ontario